Marko Maroši (born 23 October 1993) is a Slovak professional footballer who plays as a goalkeeper for Shrewsbury Town. He is a former Slovakia U21 international.

Early life
Maroši is a former student of Burnley College, where he studied for an Advanced Diploma in Public Services and trained with the college's football academy.

Club career

Wigan Athletic
Maroši started his professional career at Wigan Athletic, scoring his contract after an impressive trial. Then-manager Roberto Martínez left soon after. He made an appearance for Wigan's under-21s in a friendly against his former club Barnoldswick Town, which they won 5–2.

Doncaster Rovers
He next joined Doncaster Rovers on a free transfer, signing a two-year deal on 7 August 2014. Maroši made his official debut for Doncaster Rovers on 27 September 2014, in a 3-0 away defeat to Walsall after replacing Jed Steer in the 30th minute due to an injury. He made his first start for the club in an FA Cup third round replay against Bristol City, following Sam Johnstone's recall by Manchester United. He was released by Doncaster at the end of the 2018–19 season.

Coventry City
On 22 May 2019, Marosi agreed to join Coventry City on a three-year deal upon the expiry of his contract on 30 June 2019.

Shrewsbury Town
Maroši signed for Shrewsbury Town on a three-year deal for an undisclosed fee on 24 June 2021.

International career
Maroši has one appearance for Slovakia's under-21 team, in a friendly against Portugal's under-20s. He was also a member of the squad in the unsuccessful attempt to qualify for the 2015 Under-21 Euros.

Career statistics

Honours
Individual
PFA Team of the Year: 2019–20 League One

References

External links

1993 births
Living people
Slovak footballers
People from Michalovce
Sportspeople from the Košice Region
Association football goalkeepers
Barnoldswick Town F.C. players
Wigan Athletic F.C. players
Doncaster Rovers F.C. players
Coventry City F.C. players
Shrewsbury Town F.C. players
English Football League players